Basbousa is a sweet, syrup-soaked semolina cake that originated in Egypt. The semolina batter is baked in a sheet pan, then sweetened with orange flower water, rose water or simple syrup, and typically cut into diamond (lozenge) shapes or squares. The dish has also spread within most areas of the former Ottoman Empire, and is generally featured in Middle Eastern cuisines, Greek cuisine, Azerbaijani cuisine, Ethiopian cuisine, and many others.

Names

It is found in the cuisines of the Middle East, the Balkans and the North Africa under a variety of names. 
Arabic:  هريسة harīsa (meaning mashed or crushed), نمورة nammoura, بسبوسة basbūsah

Greek: ραβανί (ravani), ρεβανί (revani), σάμαλι (samali)

Macedonian and 

Basbousa is the most common name for this dessert in the Middle East but it may be named differently depending on the region; It is often called "hareesa" in the Levant. Note that "harissa" in North Africa is a spicy red sauce. It is a popular dessert offered in most sweets bakeries in the Middle East and especially popular in Ramadan.

Variations
Pastūsha (sometimes stylized as pastūçha) is a variant of basbousa that originated in Kuwait in the 2010s. Like basbousa, it is made from semolina soaked in sweet syrup. It is characterized by the addition of finely ground pistachios and orange flower water.

Basbousa bil ashta – a Levantine variation of basbousa filled with ashta cream in the middle.

Vegan Basbousa – Basbusa is also available in vegan form using apple sauce to bind the base mix together instead of dairy and eggs.

Basbousa eem Tapuzim - a Israeli variation from the coastal region, it is flavored with orange juice giving it a more sweet and aromatic flavour.

Basbousa bil Tamr - Libyan variant of basbousa where date spread is being added between two layers of the basbousa.

Basbousa eem Tmarim - Israeli variant of basbousa with dates, unlike the Libyan variant, the dates are being cooked in ghee then added to the mix in addition to cinnamon and cardamom to flavor, giving it a black color in the process. It is served alongside with tea after the fasting of Yom Kippur is over.

Qizha - Palestinian variant of Basbousa with nigella seeds paste called Qizha.

Hilbeh - Palestinian variant of Basbousa flavoured with fenugreek seeds.

See also
 Arab cuisine
 List of Turkish desserts
 Hurma
 Melomakarono

References

Works cited

Cakes
Egyptian cuisine
Levantine cuisine
Ottoman cuisine
North African cuisine
Turkish desserts
Arab desserts
Arab pastries
Greek desserts
Armenian desserts
Semolina dishes
Albanian cuisine
African cuisine